Gordian Knot is the debut album of Sean Malone's progressive rock project of the same name.

The cover of the album features an image from a bubble chamber – an early particle detector

The song "Reflections" was first demoed by guitarist Glenn Snelwar in 1994 for his solo project, At War With Self, and also appears on the band's third album, A Familiar Path, released in 2009.

Track listing
"Galois" ( – 2:05, Malone) - Malone
"Code/Anticode" ( – 6:44, Malone) - Malone, Reinert, Gunn, Jarzombek
"Reflections" ( – 6:49, Snelwar, Malone, Reinert) - Malone, Reinert, Snelwar
"Megrez" ( – 4:00, Gunn, Malone) - Gunn
"Singularity" ( – 4:43, Malone, Snelwar, Reinert) - Reinert, Malone, Snelwar, Jarzombek, Gunn
"Redemption's Way" ( – 6:58, Malone) - Malone, Myung, Snelwar, Gunn
"Komm süsser Tod, komm sel'ge" ( – 2:24, J.S. Bach, arr. Malone) - Malone
"Rivers Dancing" ( – 7:35, Malone, Snelwar, Reinert) - Reinert, Snelwar, Malone, Jarzombek, Gunn
"Srikara Tal" ( – 9:18, Malone) - Malone, Myung, Gunn
"Grace"  ( – 7:34, Malone) - Malone
"Unquity Road***"  – 5:28 (Japanese Exclusive Bonus Track)

Personnel
Sean Malone (Cynic, Aghora, Anomaly) - Fretless bass, Chapman stick, keyboards
John Myung (Dream Theater, Platypus, The Jelly Jam) - Chapman stick
Trey Gunn (King Crimson, KTU) - Warr guitar
Glenn Snelwar (At War With Self) - guitars, mandolins
Ron Jarzombek (Spastic Ink, Blotted Science, Watchtower) - guitars
Adam Levy (Norah Jones) - guitars
Sean Reinert (Cynic, Death, Aghora) - drums, percussion

References

1999 debut albums
Gordian Knot (band) albums